Linan or Lin'an may refer to the following locations in China:

Hangzhou, formerly named Lin'an in the Song Dynasty
Lin'an District, a district of Hangzhou, Zhejiang

Towns and Townships
Linan, Fujian, a town in Xianyou County, Fujian
Linan, Hunan (澧南), a town in Li County, Hunan
Lin'an, Yunnan (临安), a town in Jianshui County, Yunnan
Linan Township (里南乡), a township in Shengzhou, Zhejiang

See also
 Liñán, Spanish surname